The Acaponeta River originates in the State of Durango, México and drains into the Pacific Ocean.

From its beginning in Durango to where it crosses into Nayarit, the river is called Quebrada de San Bartolo; farther downstream it's referred to as the Acaponeta.

Crossing the municipalities of Pueblo Nuevo, Durango; and Huajicori and Acaponeta, in Nayarit; it passes by the regions of Mineral de Cucharas, Quiviquinta, Huajicori, Acaponeta, San Felipe Aztatán, Tecuala,   Milpas Viejas, El Filo and Quimichis; with its mouth in Estero de Teacapán, in a place called Puerta del Río (River's gate).

The river has a total length of  until Barra del Novillero; in the last , given its gentle slope, it is navagable by canoe, even in the dry seasons.

See also
List of rivers of Mexico
List of rivers of the Americas by coastline

References 

Rivers of Durango
Rivers of Mexico
Rivers of Nayarit